The Museum of Nature and Environment of the Republic of Belarus is a museum in Minsk, Belarus, founded in 1991 at Minsk on the basis of the nature of Belarusian National History and Culture Museum. There are more than 40 thousand exhibits inside an exposition area of 350 m2. In the 6 thematic rooms (mineralogical, fenalagichny, nature, river, lake, forest) exhibits tell about the natural riches of the evolution of flora and fauna from antiquity to the present day.

Gallery

External links

Museums in Minsk
Natural history museums
Museums established in 1983
1983 establishments in Belarus